Silakala Ambosamanera was King of Anuradhapura in the 6th century, whose reign lasted from 526 to 539. He succeeded his father Upatissa II as King of Anuradhapura and was succeeded by his son Dathappabhuti.

See also
 List of Sri Lankan monarchs
 History of Sri Lanka

References

External links
 Kings & Rulers of Sri Lanka
 Codrington's Short History of Ceylon

Monarchs of Anuradhapura
S
S
S